Will Power (born 1981) is an Australian motorsport driver.

Will Power may also refer to:

 Will Power (performer), American actor, rapper, playwright, and educator
 Will Power (TV series), a 2013 drama series
 Will Power (album), a 1987 album by Joe Jackson
 Will Power (film), a 1913 silent American short comedy film
 "Will Power", a song by DC Talk from the 1992 album Free at Last

See also
 Will Powers, stagename for Lynn Goldsmith
 Will Powers, fictional character from Ace Attorney, see List of Ace Attorney characters
 Powerhouse Hobbs, ring name of professional wrestler William Hobson
 William Power (disambiguation)
 Willpower (disambiguation)
 Power (disambiguation)
 Will (disambiguation)

Power, Will